Adolf Muschg (born 13 May 1934) is a Swiss writer and professor of literature. Muschg was a member of the Gruppe Olten.

Biography 
Adolf Muschg was born in Zollikon, canton of Zürich, Switzerland.  He studied German studies, English studies and philosophy at the universities of Zürich and Cambridge and earned his doctoral degree with a work about Ernst Barlach.

Between 1959 and 1962, he worked as a teacher in Zürich. Different engagements as a teacher followed in (Göttingen), Japan and the US. From 1970 to 1999 Muschg was professor of German language and literature at the Eidgenössische Technische Hochschule, Zürich.

He wrote the foreword to Fritz Zorn’s controversial memoirs Mars. The book pointed out the supposedly "cancer-causing" lifestyle of Zurich's wealthy gold coast and provoked a scandal in Switzerland; its author died of cancer before its release. Muschg was also provocative with works like Wenn Auschwitz in der Schweiz liegt ("If Auschwitz were in Switzerland"). His detractors suggest that Muschg was writing without direct experience. A theme of his newer works is often love in old age.

Since 1976 he has been a member of the Academy of Arts, Berlin; he is also a member of the Akademie der Wissenschaften und der Literatur, Mainz and the Deutsche Akademie für Sprache und Dichtung, Darmstadt. In 2003 he was elected president of the Berlin Academy but left the presidency in December 2005 because of disagreements with the academy's senate about public relations.

Muschg lives in Männedorf near Zürich. His estate is archived in the Swiss Literary Archives in Bern.

Awards 
 1968 Conrad Ferdinand Meyer Prize
 1974 Hermann-Hesse-Literaturpreis
 1984 Zürich Literature Prize
 1990 Carl Zuckmayer Medal
 1993 Ricarda-Huch-Preis
 1994 Georg Büchner Prize
 1995 Vilenica International Literary Prize
 2001 Grimmelshausen-Preis
 2017 Prize of the Internationale Hermann-Hesse-Gesellschaft

Works 

 Im Sommer des Hasen, 1965
 Gegenzauber, 1967
 Fremdkörper, 1968
 Rumpelstilz. Ein kleinbürgerliches Trauerspiel, 1968
 Mitgespielt, 1969
 Papierwände, 1970
 Die Aufgeregten von Goethe. Ein politisches Drama, 1971
 Liebesgeschichten, 1972
 Albissers Grund, crime novel, 1974
 Entfernte Bekannte, 1976
 Kellers Abend. Ein Stück aus dem 19. Jahrhundert, 1976
 Noch ein Wunsch, 1979
 Baiyun oder die Freundschaftsgesellschaft, 1980
 Leib und Leben, 1982
 Das Licht und der Schlüssel. Erziehungsroman eines Vampirs, novel, 1984
 Goethe als Emigrant, 1986
 Der Turmhahn und andere Lebensgeschichten, 1987
 Der Rote Ritter. Eine Geschichte von Parzival, 1993
 Herr, was fehlt euch? Zusprüche und Nachreden aus dem Sprechzimmer eines heiligen Grals, 1994
 Nur ausziehen wollte sie sich nicht, 1995
 Die Insel, die Kolumbus nicht gefunden hat. Sieben Gesichter Japans, 1995
 O mein Heimatland!, 1998
 Sutters Glück, 2001
 Das gefangene Lächeln. Eine Erzählung, 2002
 Gehen kann ich allein und andere Liebesgeschichten, 2003
 Der Schein trügt nicht. Ueber Goethe, 2004
 Eikan, du bist spät, 2005

Other works 
 Gottfried Keller, biography, 1977
 Wenn Auschwitz in der Schweiz liegt, 1997

Voice recordings 
 Baiyun oder die Freundschaftsgesellschaft; Läufer und Brücken – eine unveröffentlichte Erzählung. Ausschnitte aus der Lesung in Hoser's Buchhandlung am 4. Oktober 1979 (Hoser's Buchhandlung, Stuttgart, ohne Nummer) (1 LP)

Literature 
 Judith Ricker-Abderhalden (ed.): Über Adolf Muschg. Suhrkamp, Frankfurt am Main 1979, .
 Renate Voris: Adolf Muschg. C.H. Beck, Munich 1984. .
 Manfred Dierks (ed.): Adolf Muschg. Suhrkamp, Frankfurt 1989, .
 Andreas Dorschel: 'Tüchtig nach Hause geleuchtet', in Süddeutsche Zeitung, nr 103 (5 May 2004), p. 16.
 Rüdiger Schaper: 'Wer im Glashaus schwitzt. Akademie-Präsident Adolf Muschg gibt auf', in: Der Tagesspiegel, nr 19047 (16 December 2005), .
  Alexandre Mirlesse: En attendant l'Europe (Rencontre avec Adolf Muschg). La Contre Allée, Lille 2009, .

References

External links 

 Literary estate of Adolf Muschg in the archive database HelveticArchives of the Swiss National Library
 Publications by and about Adolf Muschg in the catalogue Helveticat of the Swiss National Library
 Portrait of the author by Suhrkamp Verlag
 Information by the ETH Zurich
 
 Website of Adolf Muschg

1934 births
Living people
People from Meilen District
Swiss writers in German
People associated with the University of Zurich
Academic staff of ETH Zurich
Georg Büchner Prize winners
Members of the Academy of Arts, Berlin